The 1906 St. Louis Cardinals season was the team's 25th season in St. Louis, Missouri and the 15th season in the National League. The Cardinals went 52–98 during the season and finished 7th in the National League.

Regular season

Season standings

Record vs. opponents

Notable transactions 
 July 13, 1906: Spike Shannon was traded by the Cardinals to the New York Giants for Doc Marshall and Sam Mertes.

Roster

Player stats

Batting

Starters by position 
Note: Pos = Position; G = Games played; AB = At bats; H = Hits; Avg. = Batting average; HR = Home runs; RBI = Runs batted in

Other batters 
Note: G = Games played; AB = At bats; H = Hits; Avg. = Batting average; HR = Home runs; RBI = Runs batted in

Pitching

Starting pitchers 
Note: G = Games pitched; IP = Innings pitched; W = Wins; L = Losses; ERA = Earned run average; SO = Strikeouts

Other pitchers 
Note: G = Games pitched; IP = Innings pitched; W = Wins; L = Losses; ERA = Earned run average; SO = Strikeouts

References

External links
1906 St. Louis Cardinals at Baseball Reference
1906 St. Louis Cardinals team page at www.baseball-almanac.com

St. Louis Cardinals seasons
Saint Louis Cardinals season
St Louis